HMS Pigeon was a 10-gun  built for the Royal Navy during the 1820s. She was sold in 1847.

Description
The ship's tonnage was 230 64/94 tons burthen. The Cherokee class was armed with two 6-pounder cannon and eight 18-pounder carronades. The ships had a crew of 52 officers and ratings.

Construction and career
Pigeon, the fourth ship of her name to serve in the Royal Navy, was ordered under the name of Variable on 25 March 1823, laid down in May 1825 at Pembroke Dockyard, Wales, and launched on 6 October 1827. She was renamed Pigeon on 2 February 1829 and completed on 23 February 1829 at Plymouth Dockyard.

Notes

References

Cherokee-class brig-sloops
1827 ships
Ships built in Pembroke Dock